Hawker or Hawkers may refer to:

Places
Hawker, Australian Capital Territory, a suburb of Canberra
Hawker, South Australia, a town
Division of Hawker, an Electoral Division in South Australia
Hawker Island, Princess Elizabeth Land, Antarctica
Hawker Creek, Missouri, United States

In business
 Hawker (trade), a vendor of food or merchandise
 Hawker Aircraft, a British aircraft manufacturer
 Hawkers (company), a Spanish sunglasses company

Other uses
 Hawker (surname)
 One who practices falconry, hunting with hawks
 Hawker College, a senior secondary college in the Australian Capital Territory
 Hawker (dragonfly), a family of dragonflies in North America and Europe